The Gibraltar national badminton team represents Gibraltar in international badminton team competitions. It is controlled by the Gibraltar Badminton Association, the governing body for badminton in Gibraltar. The team have never competed in the European Men's and Women's Team Badminton Championships.

Gibraltar competed in the Sudirman Cup mixed team finals in 2001 and 2003. Gibraltar competed as the neutral "IBF Team" in the 2001 Sudirman Cup due to the Gibraltar dispute. An appeal by the Gibraltar Badminton Association to compete under the Gibraltar name and flag was rejected by the Court of Arbitration for Sport.

Participation in BWF competitions

Sudirman Cup

Participation in Island Games

Current squad 

Male players
Kasper Thy Jessen
Charles Avellano
James Linares

Female players
Alison Jessen
Chantal De'Ath

References

Badminton
National badminton teams
Badminton in Gibraltar